Sodhi are landlord people from Khatri or Kshatriyas clan from the Punjab region. Seven of the Sikh Gurus, from Guru Ram Das to Guru Gobind Singh were of Sodhi surname.

In the Bachittar Natak Guru Gobind Singh wrote the origin of Sodhi clan and described them as linear descendants of Lava, one of the twin sons of Sita and Rama. According to the legend, some of the descendants migrated to Sanaudh  where the clan chieftain married the daughter of the king and had a son named Sodhi Rai whose descendants ruled over the  Sanaudh region now known as East and West Punjab and Haryana and some parts of Himachal Pradesh and Jammu & Kashmir

At the time of the Sikh Empire, Maharaja Ranjit Singh awarded aristocratic Sodhi patricians grants of jagirs, feudal, titular land grants and lordships bestowed upon subjected noblemen and patrons by a ruling monarch, worth 500,000 a year. Ranjit Singh lavishly patronised a descendant of Dhir Mahal, Sodhi Sadhu Singh, with a gift of several villages. The original copy of the Adi Granth, also known as the Kartarpuri Bir, is reported to be in the possession of the descendants of Sodhi Sadhu Singh at Kartarpur.

The Sodhis of Anandpur Sahib are descendants of Sodhi Suraj Mal, one of Guru Hargobind Sahib Ji's sons and brother of Guru Tegh Bahadur Ji. The Sodhis of Anandpur held revenue free lands in Anandpur Sahib and various other parts of Punjab. They were the ruling family of Anandpur Sahib.

Notable People

Entertainment 

 Shruti Sodhi, Indian actress
 Shellee Sodhi, Indian poet, film lyricist and writer.

Politics 

 Daya Singh Sodhi, Indian politician from BJP
 Rana Gurmit Singh Sodhi, International shooter and politician

Sports 
 Balbir Singh Sodhi, murder victim of 9/11 attack in USA
 Harvinder Sodhi, Indian first-class cricketer 
 Ish Sodhi, New Zealand-based international cricketer
 Rana Gurmit Singh Sodhi, International shooter and politician
 Reetinder Singh Sodhi, Ex International Indian cricketer And Captain of Indian under 16 World Cup winning team in 1998.
 Ronjan Sodhi international shooter athlete, Asian Games Gold Medalist in double-trap 
 Surinder Singh Sodhi, Captain of Indian Hockey team who won the gold medal in 1980 Olympics .

Fictional People 

 Roshan Singh Sodhi, fictional character in Taarak Mehta Ka Ooltah Chashmah
 Colonel Balbir Singh Sodhi, fictional character in Kohram played by Amitabh Bacchan
 Ajeet Sodhi as politician , fictional character in Tabbar played by Ranvir Shorey

See also 

 Sodhi Bala, village in Khushab district, West Punjab

References 

Indian surnames
Punjabi tribes
Khatri clans
Punjabi-language surnames
Surnames of Indian origin
Hindu surnames
Khatri surnames